AS Leonis Minoris (AS LMi), also known as TYC 2505-672-1, is an eclipsing binary system in the constellation of Leo Minor. It has by far the longest period, 69.1 years, of any known eclipsing binary. During its roughly 3.45 year long eclipses, it fades by 4.5 magnitudes (about a factor of 60).

AS LMi's variability was first detected in 2013, during a search for "disappearing stars" in the MASTER database.   It was initially thought to be an R Coronae Borealis variable star, although its fading was unusually slow for an R Coronae Borealis variable. Because R Coronae Borealis variables fade repeatedly, the discovery of the star's dramatic brightness decline triggered a search of archival photographic plates for evidence of earlier dimming events. Tang et al. used DASCH to search the large collection of Harvard photographic plates, and found that the star had dimmed for three years during the 1940s. They recognized that AS LMi is a very long period eclipsing binary, similar to the ε Aurigae system.

The binary system consists of an M-giant primary star orbited by a small hot secondary star that is itself surrounded by an optically thick (large optical depth) disk.

References

Algol variables
Leo Minor
Leonis Minoris, AS